Sir John Lewis Arnold (January 26, 1915 – October 9, 2004) was a British judge. He was President of the Family Division of the High Court of Justice from 1979 to 1988.

Biography 
Arnold was educated Wellington College and University of Würzburg. He was called to the Bar by the Middle Temple in 1937. He became a tenant of Wilfred Hunt's chambers shortly before the outbreak of the Second World War, when he joined the Royal Artillery as a gunner. He was later commissioned and served in northwest Europe as an intelligence officer with 11th Armoured Division, then the 52nd Division Headquarters. He was severely wounded in Bremen in 1945. The same year, he was mentioned in despatches.

After the war, Arnold practiced at the Chancery bar. He became a Queen's Counsel in 1958.

References

1915 births
2004 deaths
Presidents of the Family Division
Members of the Privy Council of the United Kingdom
British Army personnel of World War II
People educated at Wellington College, Berkshire
Family Division judges
Knights Bachelor
University of Würzburg alumni
Royal Artillery officers
English King's Counsel
20th-century King's Counsel